Liu Zhigeng (born June 1956) is a former Chinese politician. He was the Vice-Governor of Guangdong and the Communist Party Secretary of Dongguan. On February 4, 2016, Liu was placed under investigation by the Communist Party's anti-corruption agency.

Career
Liu Zhigeng was born in Xingning, Guangdong in June 1956. He was the teacher of Pei Ning commune Primary School from 1973 to 1978. In 1979, he entered Jilin University and graduated in 1983. He joined the Communist Party in February 1985. From 1983 to 1992, Liu Zhigeng worked in Shenzhen Municipal Planning Bureau. In 1993 he became the mayor of Longgang District and the Communist Party Secretary of Longgang District in 1995. In 2002, Liu became the mayor of Qingyuan. Liu Zhigeng held power in Dongguan from 2004 to 2011, which served as CPC Deputy Secretary, Mayor, Director of People's Congress, and CPC Secretary. In 2011, Liu Zhigeng became the Vice-Governor of Guangdong.

On February 4, 2016, Liu Zhigeng was placed under investigation by the Central Commission for Discipline Inspection, the party's internal disciplinary body, for "serious violations of regulations". Liu was expelled from the Communist Party on April 18, 2016, for "joining superstitious activities, membership in private clubs and bribery".

On May 31, 2017, Liu was sentenced to life in prison for taking bribes worth 98.17 million yuan in Nanning.

References

1956 births
Living people
People from Xingning
Political office-holders in Guangdong
Chinese Communist Party politicians from Guangdong
People's Republic of China politicians from Guangdong
Jilin University alumni
Expelled members of the Chinese Communist Party
Politicians from Meizhou
Chinese politicians convicted of corruption